Holon is the only album by electro-industrial and drum and bass band Equinox, released in 1998 by Hypnotic. Equinox was a side project of Canadian industrial musicians Bill Leeb and Chris Peterson of Canadian industrial band Front Line Assembly.

The album spawned the vinyl-only single Contact, including a remix of the title track and album track "Phenomena". Tracks from Holon also found their way onto the compilations Cryogenic Studios and Cryogenic Studio, Vol. 2 both of which are collections of tracks from Front Line Assembly and related projects.

Track listing

References

1998 albums
Industrial albums by Canadian artists